The Pishchalskoye peat railway is located in Kirov Oblast, Russia.

Current status 
Pishchalskoye peat railway emerged in the 1963s, in the area Orichevsky District, in a settlement named Mirnyi. The railway was built for hauling peat and carrying workers to and from the peat extraction. The railway runs 3–4 cargo runs every day from two peat deposits. Peat is transshipped on broad gauge  rail line and taken to Kirov, Sharyu to a Combined heat and power (CHP).

Rolling stock

Locomotives 
TU4 – № 2170, 2620, 3076, 2129, 2273
ESU2A – № 786, 434, 921, 102
TU6A – № 2172
TU6D – № 0159
TU8 – № 0426
PMD3 – № 156, 116 (№ 405)

Railroad car
Flatcar
Tank car
Snowplow
Tank car – fire train
Passenger car
Open wagon for peat
Hopper car to transport track ballast

Work trains 
Crane GK-5
Track UPS-1- № 31
Track laying cranes PPR2ma

Gallery

See also

Narrow-gauge railways in Russia
Gorokhovskoye peat railway
Dymnoye peat railway
Otvorskoye peat railway

References and sources

External links

 Official Website 
Photo – project «Steam Engine» 
«The site of the railroad» S. Bolashenko 

750 mm gauge railways in Russia
Rail transport in Kirov Oblast